Premier Manager 2003–04 is a football management simulation game, developed and published by Zoo Digital Publishing and released for the Game Boy Advance, PlayStation 2 and Windows in November 2003. It is the ninth game in the Premier Manager series.

Gameplay 
Premier Manager 2003–04 is a football management simulation game that puts the player in charge of a team of their choice from the top four English divisions (Premier League to the Second Division, as it was known at the time) or the top two Italian, German, French and Spanish leagues. As in the previous title in the series, Premier Manager 2002/2003 Season, players are required to undertake meetings with chairmen, coaches, scouts and players, with dialogue choices impacting how club personnel perceive the manager, as well as the performance of players on the pitch. Matches are played in a 2D engine, as opposed to the 3D engine used in the previous title.

Development 
The title is the first in the series developed and published by Zoo Digital Publishing, following their acquisition of the intellectual property rights of Gremlin Interactive in October 2003.

Reception 

Reviewing the Game Boy Advance version Official Nintendo Magazine gave a score of 64%, contending that while the game "certainly gives you a powerful thrill when your team's score changes from 0 to 1 on the Teletext-style interface", there "doesn't seem to be enough depth to stop you feeling the results are ultimately random".

References 

2003 video games
Association football management video games
Video games developed in the United Kingdom
PlayStation 2 games
Game Boy Advance games
Single-player video games